Iranian Green Party may refer to:
 Green Party of Iran, a banned Green party exiled in Germany
 Green Party (Iran), a conservative party based in Iran and represented in the parliament